Susan Anita Jayne Chick (née Morley, born 6 January 1960) is a British former athlete who competed in the 400 metres hurdles. She finished seventh in the 400 metres hurdles final at the 1983 World Championships. She also represented Great Britain in the women's 400 metres hurdles at the 1984 Los Angeles Olympics, and England at the 1982 Commonwealth Games. Her sister, Kay Morley-Brown, is also a former international hurdler.

Career
Born in Swinton, then in the West Riding of Yorkshire, Morley won the 400 metres hurdles title at the 1980 AAA Championships in 58.76 secs. In 1982, she won the UK Championships title in 57.10, retained her AAA title in 57.31, and ended the season finishing fourth in the final at the 1982 Commonwealth Games in 57.57.

Morley won her second UK title in 1983 in 56.67 secs, before going on to finish seventh in the final of the 400 metres hurdles at the 1983 World Championships in Helsinki in 56.04 secs, to break Christine Warden's 1979 British record of 56.06. Morley's record was broken in 1988 by Sally Gunnell. In 1984, following injury during the winter season, she reached the semifinals at the Los Angeles Olympics, running 56.67.

Morley's final year ranked in the UK top three was 1985, when under her married name of Sue Chick, she ranked third with a season's best of 58.15 secs. As of 2018, her best time of 56.04 secs, ranks her 13th on the UK all-time list.

International competitions

National titles
AAA Championships (1980, 1982)
UK Championships (1982, 1983)

References

1960 births
Living people
People from Swinton, South Yorkshire
Athletes from Yorkshire
English female hurdlers
British female hurdlers
Olympic athletes of Great Britain
Athletes (track and field) at the 1984 Summer Olympics
Commonwealth Games competitors for England
Athletes (track and field) at the 1982 Commonwealth Games
Athletes (track and field) at the 1986 Commonwealth Games
World Athletics Championships athletes for Great Britain